CPL Productions (formerly Celador) is a BAFTA award winning independent television and radio production company run by Danielle Lux, Murray Boland and Janet Oakes.  It was formed in the United Kingdom in 1981 as an independent television production company. It created and produced a number of popular light entertainment shows and is best known for the TV format Who Wants to Be a Millionaire? and the film Slumdog Millionaire which, in 2009, collected seven BAFTAs, four Golden Globes and eight Oscars including Best Director and Best Picture.

The name Celador is a re-spelling of "cellar door", a phrase whose sound is often noted to be particularly euphonious.

History
Formerly known as Celador, the company was founded by Paul Smith, and included Jasper Carrott as one of its founder shareholders. After establishing itself as a leading UK production company it expanded into TV format licensing, film production and radio station ownership and operation. By 2006, Celador was owned by Complete Communications Corporation, a firm which Smith (who owned 18%) wanted to break up so he could concentrate on radio and film production. Managing director and former 1990s Top of the Pops presenter Adrian Woolfe wanted to buy the television division outright as part of a management buyout with Danielle Lux, but this was split into parts with Lux completing the buy-out of Celador Productions without Woolfe and the rights to Who Wants to Be a Millionaire?. Celador Productions would be re-named it to CPL, before becoming a division of ProSieben's Red Arrow Studios.

Who Wants to Be a Millionaire? 
Celador International and the rights and associated properties of Who Wants to Be a Millionaire? were acquired by Dutch group 2waytraffic, eventually becoming part of Sony Pictures Television. In 2004, Celador commenced legal action against The Walt Disney Company for what it claimed were unpaid profits from the American version of the programme, licensed by Disney for its ABC TV channel.  At a trial by jury in Los Angeles in June 2010, Celador was awarded $269m (£177m) in damages after ruling it failed to receive a fair share of profits.

CPL Productions
As of 2022, CPL Productions is making a new version of You Are What You Eat with Trisha Goddard and Amir Khan for Channel 5 and has teamed up with the Ranga Bee production company to make a six-part comedy series, written and created by Romesh Ranganathan and Benjamin Green for BBC Studios, called
Avoidance.

Television
Hold the Front Page
Britain's Greatest Obsessions
Life and Rhymes
Quizness
Rob & Romesh Vs. 
Trip Hazard
90 Day Fiance UK
Brief Encounters
Ellie & Natasia
High Strangeness
Love is Blind (UK Version) 
Avoidance (co-production with Ranga Bee)
Married at First Sight (UK version)
You Are What You Eat (Channel 5 version)
A League of Their Own (British game show) (Sky TV)

Radio 

 Gossip and Goddesses with Granny Kumar
 Hennikay
 Influencers
 Ruby Wax Talking Human
 Scrambled EGG

Celador Entertainment

Television
All About Me
Canned Carrott (as well as many other stand up shows with Jasper Carrott)
Commercial Breakdown (originally called Carrott's Commercial Breakdown)
The Detectives (with Jasper Carrott)
Everybody's Equal
The Hypnotic World of Paul McKenna
It's Been a Bad Week
The People Versus
Richard Digance's Greatest Bits
Talking Telephone Numbers
Turn Back Your Body Clock
Wayne Dobson Close-up
Who Wants to Be a Millionaire? (format now owned by Sony under the 2WayTraffic banner)
Winning Lines
You Are What You Eat (Channel 4 version)

Films
Dirty Pretty Things (2002) directed by Stephen Frears and starring Audrey Tautou and Chiwetel Ejiofor
Separate Lies (2005) written and directed by Julian Fellowes and starring Emily Watson, Tom Wilkinson and Rupert Everett
The Descent (2006) directed by Neil Marshall and starring Shauna Macdonald, Natalie Mendoza, Alex Reid, Saskia Mulder, Nora-Jane Noone and MyAnna Buring
Slumdog Millionaire (2008)
The Descent Part 2 (2009)
The Scouting Book for Boys (2010)
Centurion (2010)

Celador Radio

Celador previously owned twenty-seven UK commercial radio stations including The Breeze and Sam FM networks and Fire Radio. In January 2017 Celador Radio acquired Anglian Radio's five stations (North Norfolk Radio, Radio Norwich, The Beach, Town 102 and Dream 100) which broadcast across the Anglian region. In 2019 Celador Radio disposed of its entire radio division to Bauer Media.

The final portfolio comprised the following radio stations, which were sold to Bauer Radio in February 2019.

The Breeze Network
The Breeze (Andover)
The Breeze (Bristol)
The Breeze (Basingstoke & North Hampshire)
The Breeze (Bath)
The Breeze (Bridgwater & West Somerset)
The Breeze (Cheltenham & North Gloucestershire)
The Breeze (East Hampshire & South West Surrey)
The Breeze (Frome & West Wiltshire)
The Breeze (Newbury)
The Breeze (North Dorset)
The Breeze (North Somerset)
The Breeze (Portsmouth)
The Breeze (Reading)
The Breeze (Southampton)
The Breeze (South Devon)
The Breeze (Winchester)
The Breeze (Yeovil & South Somerset)

Sam FM Stations
Sam FM (Bristol)
Sam FM (South Coast)
Sam FM (Swindon)
Sam FM (Thames Valley)

Anglian Radio Network

 Dream 100 FM (Colchester)
 Town 102 (Ipswich)
 The Beach (Great Yarmouth/Lowestoft)

 North Norfolk Radio (Cromer/Sheringham)
 Radio Norwich 99.9 (Norwich)

Other stations
Fire Radio (Bournemouth and Poole)

People
Paul Smith, CBE, is Chairman of Celador Entertainment Limited which is the parent company for Celador Films, Celador Radio, Celador Theatrical and Lusam Music.

Ellis Watson, was the CEO until 2003. Following the new structure of Celador's previous constituent divisions, Celador Productions, (renamed CPL Productions) is now run by managing director (since 2003) Danielle Lux. Christian Colson left Celador Films as Managing Director in 2009 to form Cloud Nine Films, now renamed Cloud Eight Films.

In the last few years, former managing director Adrian Woolfe has teamed up with Claudia Rosencrantz, the person who commissioned Who Wants To Be A Millionaire? originally at ITV, to  launch the Studio 1 production company and an entertainment news network called LIT, which has been available to stream via Peacock since January 2021.

References

External links

Television production companies of the United Kingdom
Film production companies of the United Kingdom
Entertainment companies established in 1981